Jadidabad-e Shandak (also Romanized as Jadīdābād-e Shandak; also known as Shāndak, Shandak, Shandak Ghal‘eh Bīd, Shandak Morad Abad, and Shandaq) is a village in Gowhar Kuh Rural District, Nukabad District, Khash County, Sistan and Baluchestan Province, Iran. At the 2006 census, its population was 189, in 36 families.

References 

Populated places in Khash County